Tommi Välimaa (born January 20, 1984) is a Finnish professional ice hockey forward. He is currently playing with Ilves in the Finnish Liiga.

Välimaa made his SM-liiga debut playing with Ilves during the 2010–11 SM-liiga season.

Career statistics

References

External links

Living people
1984 births
Finnish ice hockey left wingers
Ässät players
FoPS players
Ilves players
KOOVEE players
Lempäälän Kisa players
Oulun Kärpät players